Roca Remolino (lit. "whirl rock") is a submarine mountain in Chacao Channel, Chile, notorious for being a major hazard for traffic along the channel. Roca Remolino does not show up during low tides. When there are strong tidal currents in Chacao Channel the rock creates a whirl effect, drawing objects to it. Roca Remolino was studied by Chilean Navy officer Francisco Hudson in the 19th century. One of the Chacao Channel bridge's pillars is being built on top of Roca Remolino.

References

Landforms of Los Lagos Region
Chiloé Archipelago
Landforms of Chile
Coasts of Los Lagos Region
Individual rocks